27 Bryant is a bus line operated by the San Francisco Municipal Railway. It connects Nob Hill to the Mission District via the Tenderloin and South of Market.

History

The line began service on August 24, 1983 as an amalgamation of the former 27 Noe and 25 San Bruno.

Service was suspended between April 2020 and January 2021 due to the COVID-19 pandemic. Around mid-August in 2020, Tenderloin residents rallied to demand the return of the 27 Bryant and 31 Balboa lines due to that neighborhood not having restored public transit.

27 Bryant Transit Reliability Project 

The 27 Bryant Transit Reliability Project is a project for reliability and traffic safety on the 27 line. This project focuses north of Market in the Tenderloin and Nob Hill neighborhoods where the 27 experiences many delays and extremely slow travel times. On April 16, 2019, the SFMTA Board of Directors approved this project.

In early September 2019, the SFMTA received a Core Values Award from the International Association for Public Participation (IAP2) USA for "Respect for Diversity, Inclusion and Culture."

Phase 1 
In August 2019, a permanent route change on the 27 went into effect on August 10, 2019, removing 11 stops and rerouting an outbound segment of the 27 line on Jones Street.

COVID-19 
Due to the COVID-19 pandemic, the scope of the project was adjusted in January 2021, which included the restoration of the 27 Bryant. The 27 was restored and the routing was modified on January 23, 2021, using the 's temporary emergency transit lanes on 7th and 8th Streets to keep buses moving via traffic congestion and easily manage crowding.

Route description

Operation 
During the COVID-19 pandemic, service now operates between 6 a.m. to 10 p.m. every day. Service has no  overnight Owl bus line when service is not in operation after 10 p.m. through midnight. The frequency is every 15 minutes on weekdays; the frequency is every 20 minutes on the weekends.

Bus stop listing

References

External links

27 Bryant — via San Francisco Municipal Transportation Agency

San Francisco Municipal Railway bus routes
1983 establishments in California